Where Willy Went is a British children's novel written and illustrated by Nicholas Allan.

The book is about a sperm named Willy who lives inside Mr Browne. Just like other 300 million sperms, Willy races trying to catch the prize, an egg.

This book is written in an innocent, warm, accessible language and can be easily read by young children. It is also a useful guide for parents in need of simple explanations for facts of life.

References

Children's fiction books
British children's books
British picture books
2006 children's books
Books by Nicholas Allan
Sex education